The Church of La Compañía (Spanish: Templo de la Compañía) is a church in the city of Puebla's historic centre, in the Mexican state of Puebla.

See also

List of buildings in Puebla City
 List of Jesuit sites

External links
 

Historic centre of Puebla
Roman Catholic churches in Puebla (city)